Lasioglossum sulthicum is a species of Hymenoptera from the Halictidae family. The scientific name of this species was first published in 1853 by Frederick Smith. This species can be found in Eastern Australia and also in New Caledonia.

References

sulthicum
Insects described in 1853